Barack Obama Male Leadership Academy at A. Maceo Smith (BOMLA) is a magnet secondary school for boys located in the Oak Cliff area of Dallas, Texas. It is a part of the Dallas Independent School District. After the Irma Lerma Rangel Young Women's Leadership School, it is DISD's second single gender school.

The school, which occupies the campus of the former A. Maceo Smith High School, is named after former President of the United States Barack Obama, in honor of the fact that he was the first black President. The campus was named for Antonio Maceo Smith (1903–1977), a pioneer civil rights leader in Dallas.

History
The former B. F. Darrell Vanguard Elementary School campus was renovated until Barack Obama Male Leadership Academy at B.F. Darrell  opened. Obama opened in August 2011 with grades 6 through 9. Each subsequent year a grade level will be added until the school gets grade 12. The school had 205 students during its first year of operation. The school was dedicated on November 11, 2011.

In 2018 Obama swapped buildings with New Tech High School, with the latter now occupying B. F. Darrell while Obama now occupied the A. Maceo Smith campus, where Obama has the potential to increase its enrollment.

Admissions
A prospective student needs to meet entrance requirements before being considered for admission. He must have sufficient grade point averages in the core classes and score within the fortieth percentile in his examinations, such as the State of Texas Assessment of Academic Readiness (STAAR) or the Iowa Tests of Basic Skills (ITBS). If a prospective student meets the requirements, he will take an examination measuring his writing and mathematics skills.

Academics
Obama offers classes in Spanish, Mandarin Chinese, Latin, and robotics. 8th grade students have "accelerated curriculum" schedules. All students have access to pre-Advanced Placement classes. Students are expected to maintain an average of 85 and above. All students are required to attend Saturday Academy once a month for enrichment and academic support.

School norms
Students are required to address teachers using the standard "Mister" "Miss" or "Mrs." honorifics. Students are required to use the honorific "Brother." For instance John Smith would be "Brother John Smith" and Fred Jones would be "Brother Fred Jones." Faculty members also use the "brother" honorific to address students.

Students are divided into four different groups called "Houses."  The Houses represent the four different symbols from the school crest.  The House of Alliance is represented by hands shaking, the House of Decree is represented by an open book, the House of Expedition is represented by the winged-foot and the House of Justice is represented by scales.  Students are assigned their House when they arrive at the campus and remain in their House until graduation.  Each House also has teacher and staff advisors.

Uniform
Students are required to wear school uniforms. The uniform includes a blue oxford shirt, a tie, slacks, a black belt, student identification badge, and a jacket. All students are required to wear navy blazers while students are in hallways or common areas, but students may remove the blazers while in class. Middle school students wear gray ties, while high school students wear navy ties.

Athletics
Lacrosse is currently available for 6th-8th grade students through a partnership with Bridge Lacrosse.  Additionally, sixth-grade students can participate on the basketball team.  Students are also allowed to participate in sports at their home school location if the sport is not available at Barack Obama.

Demographics
As of the 2021 school year, 71% of students were Hispanic, 26% were Black, 1% were Asian, and 1% were White.

References

Further reading
 Whitmire, Richard. "New Boys School in Dallas." Education Week. August 2, 2011.
 Haag, Matthew. "For southern Dallas’ Barack Obama Academy, a perfect graduation rate and lifetime bonds" (". The Dallas Morning News. June 20, 2015. Updated June 21, 2015.
 Boardman, Ananda. "DISD opens all-boy magnet school with math and science focus" (". The Dallas Morning News. September 5, 2011. Updated September 6, 2011.

External links

 Barack Obama Male Leadership Academy - Dallas Independent School District

Dallas Independent School District schools
Dallas Independent School District high schools
Public high schools in Dallas
Boys' schools in Texas
Public middle schools in Texas
Public magnet schools in Dallas
Public boys' schools in the United States
Barack Obama